The Kenosee Superslides is a water park in Moose Mountain Provincial Park, or Kenosee Lake in Canada.

History
The Kenosee Superslides were built in the summer of 1985, and opened in the summer of 1986.  It has been a successful and popular retreat for many of thousands of people every summer.  The Kenosee Superslides are open from mid June to late August annually.

See also
Kenosee Lake, Saskatchewan
Tourism in Saskatchewan
Tourism in Canada

External links
 Kenosee Superslides homepage

Tourist attractions in Saskatchewan
Water parks in Canada
Wawken No. 93, Saskatchewan
Division No. 1, Saskatchewan